Oxyurichthys guibei is a species of goby endemic to Reunion Island in the western Indian Ocean.

References

Maugé, L.A., 1986. Gobiidae. p. 358-388. In J. Daget, J.-P. Gosse and D.F.E. Thys van den Audenaerde (eds.) Check-list of the freshwater fishes of Africa (CLOFFA). ISNB, Brussels; MRAC, Tervuren; and ORSTOM, Paris. Vol. 2. 

guibei
Taxa named by J. L. B. Smith
Fish described in 1959